Balaclava, Ontario may refer to:
Balaclava, Grey County, Ontario
Balaclava, Renfrew County, Ontario